A-Imdugud ( ADIM.DUGUDMUŠEN, named after God Imdugud, also read Aja-Anzu), was an early ruler of the First Dynasty of Ur in the 27th century BCE. He does not appear in the Sumerian King List, but is known from an inscribed seal found in tomb PG 1236 in the Royal Cemetery at Ur, which is the largest and probably the earliest tomb structure at the cemetery.

Tomb
Several artefacts are known from tomb PG 1236, a twin tomb at the Royal Cemetery at Ur, although the tomb was robbed in the past. Two inscribed seals were found, one is a banquet scene with an inscription Gan-Ekiga(k), and another with the depiction of a nude hero fighting lions and a war scene reminiscent of the Standard of Ur, with the name Aja-Anzu, also read A-Imdugud. This seals is very similar to the seal of Mesannepada. Gold leaves with embossed designs, as well as a reconstituted gold scepter, have also been found in the tomb.

Artifacts

Royal scepter
A gold scepter was also found in tomb PG 1236.

See also

Sumer
History of Sumer
Royal Cemetery at Ur
Near Eastern archaeology

References

Sources
Jane McIntosh: Ancient Mesopotamia. ABC-CLIO 2005, p. 73 (restricted online version (google books))
Leonard Woolley: The Sumerians. p. 38 (restricted online version (google books))

External links
Meskalamdug at Bartleby.com (Text snippet from  The Encyclopedia of World History (2001))

26th-century BC Sumerian kings
Sumerian kings
First Dynasty of Ur